Agotime, or Adangbe, is one of the Ghana–Togo Mountain languages (GTM) of the Kwa family. It is spoken by the Adan and Agotime, and also goes by the name Adangbe (Dangbe), which is a variant of the name Adangme (Dangme). It is not included in the list of GTM languages maintained by Roger Blench, unless it is a variety of Ahlo (Ago, Igo);

References

Ghana–Togo Mountain languages
Languages of Togo